Route 125 is an  north–south Massachusetts state route. It runs from Interstate 93 in Wilmington to the Massachusetts-New Hampshire state line in Haverhill, where it continues as New Hampshire Route 125 through Plaistow to Wakefield, New Hampshire. After the first , which are in Middlesex County, the rest of the route passes through Essex County.

Route description

Route 125 begins at I-93, at exit 35 (formerly 41), just south of where I-93 drops from four lanes to three.  It passes through an area of industrial parks before clipping the northwest corner of North Reading and entering Andover.  Once in Andover, the road serves as a bypass road around much of Andover's busier sections.  It intersects Route 28 with a cloverleaf interchange as it bends northward through town.  The route then enters North Andover, becoming concurrent with Route 114 for half a mile as the two routes pass Merrimack College.  Route 125 then splits northward, becoming concurrent with Route 133 again acting as a bypass, this time between North Andover's more densely populated west end and its historical center.  The two routes split at a point between Lawrence Municipal Airport and Lake Cochichewick in the northern end of town.  

From there, Route 125 passes into Haverhill in the Bradford section of town.  In Bradford, Route 125 meets a connector road between it and I-495 which passes through an industrial area.  The route then continues through the Bradford area before crossing the Merrimack River at the Basiliere Bridge.  Once it crosses the bridge into the downtown Haverhill area, Route 125 crosses Route 113 before sharing a one-block concurrency with Route 97 and a two-block concurrency with Route 110 in quick succession.  The route then turns more northwesterly, crossing I-495 directly at Exits 109A-B (formerly 51A-B). The route turns northward at Plaistow Road before entering into Plaistow, New Hampshire and becoming New Hampshire Route 125.  Main Street, meanwhile, heads into Plaistow as well, where it meets the end of New Hampshire Route 121.

Major intersections

References

External links

https://www.andovertownsman.com/opinion/history-of-the-andover-by-pass-route-125/article_0538b85a-55cc-53c8-9649-1bb8f4f584df.html

125